The Minor test (also known as Minor's test, the starch–iodine test, and the iodine–starch test), described by Victor Minor in 1928, is a qualitative medical test that is used to evaluate sudomotor function (perspiration or sweating).

Method
Tincture of iodine is applied to the skin and allowed to air-dry. After drying, the area is dusted with cornstarch or potato flour. Sweating is then encouraged by increased room temperature, exercise, use of a sauna, or pilocarpine.

When sweat reaches the surface of the skin, the starch and iodine combine, causing a dramatic color change (yellow → dark blue), allowing sweat production to be easily visualized.

Some have reported higher sensitivity and fewer drawbacks marking dry skin with water-erasable ink and observing fading.

Uses
The Minor test can be used as a diagnostic tool to evaluate underactive (hypohidrosis) and overactive (hyperhidrosis) sweating. This test can also visualize Horner's syndrome.

References

Notes

 (excessive sweating)

Medical tests